Annette Haven (born December 1, 1954) is an American former pornographic actress popular during the 1970s and 1980s.

Biography
Haven was born in Las Vegas, Nevada, and raised in a Mormon family. Following the dissolution of her marriage, Haven moved to San Francisco, where she began dancing in erotic shows, and she eventually worked as a stripper. While working in one of the strip clubs, she met porn star Bonnie Holiday and moved in with her and Holiday's boyfriend.

She was introduced to the sex industry through a role in a film called Lady Freaks in 1973 starring Holiday. Annette Haven went on to work in nearly 100 porn movies, including Desires Within Young Girls (1977), Barbara Broadcast (1977), A Coming of Angels (1977), Obsessed (1977), Sex World (1977), Dracula Sucks (aka Lust At First Bite) (1978), Maraschino Cherry (1978), Charli (1981) and The Grafenberg Spot (1985).

Haven had a mainstream cameo role in Blake Edwards's 10. Subsequently, she was considered to play the lead female role in Body Double, but it was eventually given to Melanie Griffith, who, according to director Brian De Palma, got the role because she gave a better dramatic screen test than Haven. Afterwards she became one of the director's consultants for the film and as a coach for Griffith. Before filming Body Double De Palma commented, "I'm already thinking of casting. I don't know if there's any good young porno stars out here, but the older ones—Annette Haven, Seka—some of them can really act. And Annette Haven has a terrific body."

Haven is a member of the AVN and XRCO Halls of Fame.

Awards
 AVN Hall of Fame inductee
 XRCO Hall of Fame inductee

See also
 Golden Age of Porn
 List of porn stars who appeared in mainstream films

References

External links
 
 
 
 

1954 births
American female erotic dancers
American erotic dancers
American pornographic film actresses
Living people
People from the Las Vegas Valley
Pornographic film actors from Nevada
Former Latter Day Saints
21st-century American women